The 2003 Euro-Asia Masters Challenge – Event 1 was an invitational professional non-ranking snooker held in Hong Kong in August 2003.

Featuring eight players in two groups of four, James Wattana defeated Ken Doherty 6–4 in the final to win the £30,000 prize.

Results

Round-robin stage
Group A

Results:
 Ding Junhui  2–0 Mark Williams
 James Wattana 2–0 Ding Junhui
 Jimmy White 2–0 Ding Junhui
 Mark Williams 2–0 Jimmy White
 James Wattana 2–1 Mark Williams
 James Wattana 2–1 Jimmy White

Group B

Results:
 Ken Doherty 2–0 Stephen Hendry
 Ken Doherty 2–0 Shokat Ali
 Ken Doherty 2–0 Marco Fu
 Shokat Ali 2–0 Marco Fu
 Stephen Hendry 2–0 Marco Fu
 Stephen Hendry 2–0 Shokat Ali

Knock-out stage

References

Euro-Asia Masters Challenge
2003 in Hong Kong sport
2003 in snooker